Heliocheilus neurota is a moth in the family Noctuidae. It is endemic to New South Wales, the Northern Territory, Queensland and Western Australia.

External links
Australian Faunal Directory

Heliocheilus
Moths of Australia